Giraffe and Annika is an indie, action-adventure and rhythm video game hybrid developed by Atelier Mimina and published by Playism, NIS America, and Koei Tecmo Games. It released on February 17, 2020 for Windows, August 25, 2020 for PlayStation 4 and Nintendo Switch, and August 27, 2020 for Xbox One. The game revolves around Annika, a catgirl who finds herself stranded on the island of Spica with amnesia. She must recover her memories with the help of a boy named Giraffe by finding three special star fragments. The game uses a pacifist battle system where fights are done through rhythm based action. It received mixed reviews from critics, who praised its visuals, story and battle system, but criticized the game's short length and "bland" design.

Reception 
Giraffe and Annika received an aggregate score of 67/100 for the Windows version, 70/100 for the PlayStation 4 version, and 64/100 for the Switch version on Metacritic.

Alex Fuller of RPGamer rated the PlayStation 4 version 3.5/5, calling it a "wholesome game that feels ideal for kids" or anyone seeking to relax, and calling it "incredibly adorable". He praised the game's manga presentation for cutscenes and its rhythm-based battles, but said it would have been better if they made up a larger part of the game. Ultimately saying the game did not have much depth, he called it better than the sum of its parts.

Stuart Gipp of Nintendo Life similarly rated the game's Switch version 7/10 stars, calling the game's world "laid-back and attractive" and the soundtrack "Ghibli-esque". Calling the game "chill", he noted that it was very difficult to die. Describing the game's story as "interesting and emotional", he said that while he had a good time playing the game, it was not challenging enough, also calling the character's movement "loose and unwieldy".

Jordan Rudek of Nintendo World Report rated the Switch version 5.5/10. Calling the core gameplay "shallow and boring", he also stated that the game's setting was "forgettable", with "simplistic graphics" that looked better in screenshots. While praising the story panels and rhythm sections, he called the rest of the game lackluster, saying that he was not sure of the game's intended audience.

References 

2020 video games
Windows games
PlayStation 4 games
Xbox One games
Nintendo Switch games
Nippon Ichi Software games
Koei Tecmo games
Single-player video games
Action-adventure games
Video games set on fictional islands
Fantasy video games
Video games about amnesia
Video games developed in Japan
Video games featuring female protagonists
Rhythm games
Indie video games
Playism games